Leadville is a ghost town located in the Similkameen region of British Columbia, Canada. The town is situated between Railroad Creek and Sutter Creek. Leadville was also known as Summit City.

References

Ghost towns in British Columbia